The Penitent Magdalene is a wooden sculpture of Mary Magdalene by the Italian Renaissance sculptor Donatello, created around 1453–1455. The sculpture was probably commissioned for the Baptistery of Florence. The piece was received with astonishment for its unprecedented realism. It is now in the Museo dell'Opera del Duomo in Florence. The wood used by Donatello is that of white poplar.

Iconography
Though the "Penitent Magdalene" was the usual depiction for the many single figures of Mary Magdalene in art, Donatello's gaunt, emaciated figure differs greatly from most depictions, which show a beautiful young woman in nearly perfect health. The Magdalene Penitent is famous for the detailed and very realistic carvings on the statue. Medieval hagiography in the Western church had conflated the figure of Mary Magdalene, already conflated with Mary of Bethany and the unnamed sinner in the Anointing of Jesus, with that of Saint Mary of Egypt. She was a popular figure in the Eastern Churches, who had been a prostitute before spending thirty years repenting in the desert. Donatello's depiction is similar to, and very probably influenced by, Eastern Orthodox icons of Mary of Egypt, which show a similar emaciated figure.  He thus ignored the Western legends by which Mary was daily fed by angels in the desert.

History
Documentation about the work is scarce. The earliest mentioning of the Penitent Magdalene dates from 1500 and mentions that the statue is being placed back in the Baptistery in Florence against the southwest wall. Since then, the statue has been moved a few times: in 1688 it was replaced by the baptismal font and put in storage, in 1735 it was moved back to the Baptistery against the southeast wall and in 1912 it was put back against the southwest wall. Today, being moved after restoration, it can be seen in the Sala della Maddalena in the Museo dell'Opera del Duomo in Florence.

The Renaissance art historian Giorgio Vasari mentions the work in his Vite: "In the same baptistery, opposite this tomb, a statue from Donatello's own hand can be seen, a wooden Saint Mary Magdalene in Penitence which is very beautiful and well executed, for she has wasted away by fasting and abstinence to such an extent that every part of her body reflects a perfect and complete understanding of human anatomy."Donatello executed the work when he was more than sixty years old, after he had spent a decade in Padua. The dating has been established indirectly, based on a 1455 copy from Neri di Bicci's workshop now in the Museum of the Collegiate of Empoli.

In 1500 the work was in the city's baptistery. According to an Italian historian, it was seen by Charles VIII of France in the 1480s, when he was camped with his army near Florence.

The work was damaged by the 1966 flood of the Arno, and the restoration process revealed some of the statue's original polychrome and gilding.

Sources
 
 Janson, H.W. (1957), Sculpture of Donatello, Princeton: Princeton University Press.
 Avery, Charles (1991), Donatello: catalogo completo delle opere, Firenze: Cantini, pp. 130–131
 Pope-Hennessy, John (1986), Donatello, Berlin: Propyläen.
 Strom, Deborah, "A New Chronology for Donatello's Wooden Sculpture" in Pantheon 38 no. 3 (1980) pp. 239–48.

References

Sculptures by Donatello
Wooden sculptures in Italy
1450s sculptures
Statues depicting Mary Magdalene